The 12-string bass is an electric bass with four courses of three strings each, though they occasionally have six courses of two strings.

Normal tuning is eeE-aaA-ddD-ggG, with one string of each course tuned similarly to the corresponding string of the four-string bass, and the remaining two strings tuned to the octave.

The first known 12-string bass guitar, the "Hamer Quad," was designed by Jol Dantzig and built in 1977 for Tom Petersson by Hamer Guitars. Petersson's Cheap Trick bandmate Rick Nielsen reports that Petersson first conceived of the instrument in 1973, and worked with Hamer over the next few years refining the design.

Notable players
 Tom Petersson of Cheap Trick. Gretsch unveiled the white USA Custom Shop Tom Petersson Signature 12-String Falcon Bass in 2016, followed by the "relic"-finish G6136B-TP12
 Jeff Ament of Pearl Jam. His 12-string bass playing can be heard in the song "Jeremy"
 Allen Woody of The Allman Brothers Band, Gov’t Mule and Blue Floyd
 Doug Pinnick of King's X
 Chip Z'nuff of Enuff Z'nuff
 Clint Bahr of TriPod
 Les Fradkin
 John Gallagher of Raven
Odell Robinson of Super Mega Everything and Judge Unger

Manufacturers
 Hamer Guitars 
 Dean Guitars
 Gretsch
 Waterstone Guitars
 Musicvox
 Schecter Guitar Research

Other bass guitars with 12 strings

Basses with 12 strings and different layouts have been built.

A bass with six two-string courses (bB-eE-aA-dD-gG-cC) was played by John Paul Jones of Led Zeppelin.

See also

 Eight-string bass guitar
 Mandocello
 Chapman Stick

References

External links
 12stringbass.net

Six-course bass
 

Electric bass guitars